Human Edge is a Canadian television series, which premiered on TVOntario in 1989. The program presents international documentary films on social issues.

The series was hosted in its first season by Michael Ignatieff. He was succeeded by Mary Lou Finlay in the second season, by Catherine Olsen in the third and fourth seasons, and by Ian Brown in the fifth season; Brown hosted for the remainder of the show's run.

References

1980s Canadian documentary television series
1990s Canadian documentary television series
2000s Canadian documentary television series
1989 Canadian television series debuts
TVO original programming